Manica parasitica is a species of ant in the subfamily Myrmicinae. It is endemic to California,  United States.

References

External links

Myrmicinae
Hymenoptera of North America
Insects of the United States
Endemic fauna of the United States
Insects described in 1934
Taxonomy articles created by Polbot